The 2002 European Sevens Championship was a rugby sevens competition, with the final held in Heidelberg, Germany. It was the first edition of the European Sevens championship. The event was organised by rugby's European governing body, the FIRA – Association of European Rugby (FIRA-AER).

Portugal won the first edition by defeating Georgia 24-14 in the final.

Qualification

FIRA – Association of European Rugby (FIRA-AER) organised five preliminary rugby sevens competitions in Lunel, France (17-18 May 2002), Amsterdam, Netherlands (25 May 2002), Madrid, Spain (15-16 June), Budapest, Romania (29-30 June 2002), and Sopot, Poland (20 July 2002). These competitions were intended to be applied as qualification tournaments in advance of the final in Heidelberg, Germany (17-18 August 2002). The twelve teams selected to have qualified based on points of participation and points by results in ranking order consisted of France, Portugal, Netherlands, Denmark, Georgia, Poland, Czech Republic, Croatia, Lithuania, Malta, Ukraine, and Germany. Sweden was added as a reserve team in the event of a cancellation. However Luxembourg was added to the tournament line-up to fill the vacancy created when Croatia pulled out and Sweden did not enter.

Heidelberg

Pool Stage

Pool A

Pool B

Knockout stage

Bowl

Plate

Cup

Standings

References

2002
International rugby union competitions hosted by Germany
European
2002–03 in German rugby union
2002–03 in European rugby union